Muñoz Point is the southeast point of Lemaire Island, Danco Coast, Graham Land. First mapped by the Belgian Antarctic Expedition, 1897–99. Named "Punta Muñoz" by the Chilean Antarctic Expedition, 1950–51, after Roberto Labra Muñoz, in charge of General Bernardo O'Higgins Station, 1950–51.

References

External links

Headlands of Graham Land
Danco Coast